Stormie Dawn Jones (May 30, 1977 – November 11, 1990) was the world's first recipient of a successful simultaneous heart and liver organ transplant.  On February 14, 1984, under the direction of Dr. Thomas E. Starzl, Drs. Byers W. Shaw Jr. and Henry T. Bahnson replaced the six-year-old's heart and liver at the Children's Hospital of Pittsburgh in Pittsburgh, Pennsylvania.   Stormie had a condition which raised her blood cholesterol to 10 times normal levels.  The condition, a severe form of familial hypercholesterolemia,
and the resultant high levels of low density lipoprotein that damaged her organs, gave her two heart attacks when she was six years old.  The case showed that the liver controls blood cholesterol and that high cholesterol is controllable,  and was part of the research on cholesterol and the liver that won Joseph L. Goldstein and Michael S. Brown the Nobel prize in medicine in 1985. Stormie died on November 11, 1990. Her death was related to rejection of the heart transplant she had received in 1984.

There were very specific reasons for performing a combined heart and liver transplant in this young girl. Due to her inherited condition, Stormie's liver was unable to remove cholesterol, i.e. LDL-cholesterol, from her bloodstream. As a result, her LDL-cholesterol levels became very high and caused her two heart attacks by age six. On the other hand, the transplanted liver, being normal and healthy, was able to clear the LDL-cholesterol from her blood. Indeed, after the transplant, Stormie's LDL-cholesterol declined by 81%—from an astounding 988 to a near-normal 184 mg per deciliter. Since she was going to require lifelong immunosuppressant therapy anyway to prevent rejection of her transplanted liver, and since her heart had been severely damaged by her previous heart attacks, it was decided to also perform a heart transplant.

References

External links
 1984 Pittsburgh Post-Gazette articles
 1985 Pittsburgh Press article

1977 births
1990 deaths
Heart transplant recipients
Liver transplant recipients
American children
People from Borger, Texas
People from Pittsburgh
Burials in Texas
Child deaths